FS Class 103 was a class of 2-2-2 steam locomotives of the Italian State Railways (FS), originally built for the Strade Ferrate dello Stato Piemontese (SFSP).

History
Fifteen locomotives were built in Britain between 1853 and 1855 by Sharp, Stewart and Company and were numbered 34 to 38 and 80 to 89 by the SFSP, which used them for the haulage of fast trains. In 1865 they passed to Società per le strade ferrate dell'Alta Italia (SFAI) which numbered them from 91 to 105. In 1864, SFAI purchased another five units and numbered them 106 to 110. In 1885 they were taken over by Rete Mediterranea (RM) where they were numbered 519 to 538. In 1905, only 5 units survived to be taken over by Ferrovie dello Stato (FS), which registered them as Class 103 with numbers from 1031 to 1035. Since these were obsolete machines, they were all scrapped by 1910.

Technical details
The driving wheels had a diameter of just under 2 metres and this allowed them to reach 80 km/h. The design of the engines was typically British with outside frames and inside cylinders. The tender carried 7 tons of water and 3 tons of coal. They developed 300 horsepower.

References

2-2-2 locomotives
103
Railway locomotives introduced in 1853
Standard gauge locomotives of Italy
Rete Mediterranea steam locomotives
Sharp Stewart locomotives
Passenger locomotives